Igor Pavlović (born 7 June 1986) is a Serbian footballer, who plays for Temnić.

Club career
Born in Jagodina (formerly known as Svetozarevo), Pavlović came through the Jedinstvo Paraćin youth academy. He started his senior career in his hometown in the club with same name. Later he also played with Napredak Kruševac and Novi Pazar in Serbia before moving to Hungarian side Kozármisleny SE in summer 2010. Previously, Pavlović awarded for the strongest shot in the Serbian SuperLiga in May 2009. In February 2011, he signed one and a half year contract with KSZO Ostrowiec. Following his spell in Poland, he had a half season spells with Albanian side Kukësi, Macedonian Pelister, Serbian Mačva Šabac and Macedonian Sileks. In summer 2013 he returned to Serbia and joined a third-tier side OFK Tabane Trgovački, which had just been formed by the merge of OFK Tabane, and the FK Jagodina farm team FK Trgovački Jagodina. While with Pelister, he won the Second Macedonian Football League. After a spell in Tabane, Pavlović played with Sloga Batočina, Jedinstvo Paraćin and Đerdap Kladovo for a hal-season at each. In summer 2015, Pavlović joined Temnić. After he spent a short spell on loan with Romanian side Ungheni in early 2017, Pavlović returned to Temnić. Scoring 25 goals on 18 matches in the Serbian League East, he was elected for the best league scorer for the 2016–17 season, helping the team to make promotion in the Serbian First League.

Honours

Club
Pelister
Macedonian Second League: 2011–12

Temnić
Serbian League West: 2016–17

Individual
Serbian League West best scorer: 2016–17

References

External links
 
 
 
 Career story in sandzak-sport.

1986 births
Living people
Sportspeople from Jagodina
Serbian footballers
FK Novi Pazar players
FK Napredak Kruševac players
FK Jagodina players
FK Mačva Šabac players
Serbian First League players
Serbian SuperLiga players
KSZO Ostrowiec Świętokrzyski players
Expatriate footballers in Poland
Expatriate footballers in Albania
FK Pelister players
FK Sileks players
Expatriate footballers in North Macedonia
Association football forwards
FK Kukësi players
FK Temnić players